In enzymology, an alkylamidase is an enzyme that catalyzes the chemical reaction

N-methylhexanamide + H2O  hexanoate + methylamine

Thus, the two substrates of this enzyme are N-methylhexanamide and H2O, whereas its two products are hexanoate and methylamine.

This enzyme belongs to the family of hydrolases, those acting on carbon-nitrogen bonds other than peptide bonds, specifically in linear amides.  The systematic name of this enzyme class is N-methylhexanamide amidohydrolase.

References

 

EC 3.5.1
Enzymes of unknown structure